The Mullsjö Secondary School was a secondary school in Mullsjö, Sweden, opened for the 1997-1998 school year. In its final years, the school acted as a boarding school for young floorball players.

The school also won the Boys' Floorball World Championship in 2007, 2009 and 2011.

On 26 October 2010, the Mullsjö Municipal Council voted to close down the school following the 2010-2011 school year.

References 

1997 establishments in Sweden
2011 establishments in Sweden
Boarding schools in Sweden
Defunct schools in Sweden
Educational institutions established in 1997
Educational institutions disestablished in 2011
Mullsjö
Buildings and structures in Mullsjö Municipality